Ben Jukich (born October 17, 1982) is an American former professional baseball pitcher. He played for the LG Twins of the Korea Baseball Organization (KBO).

Early years
Jukich was born on October 17, 1982 in Duluth, MN. He played college baseball at both McCook Community College and Dakota Wesleyan. He was the first Dakota Wesleyan graduate to be selected in the MLB draft.

Professional career
Jukich was originally drafted by the Oakland Athletics in the 13th round of the 2006 MLB Draft. During the 2006 season, Jukich went 3–2 with a 2.52 ERA in 16 games pitching primarily for the Vancouver Canadians. In 2007, Jukich was sent to the Cincinnati Reds to complete an earlier trade. He pitched in the Reds' organization until 2010 eventually reaching AAA. In 2010, he compiled a 7–4 record with an earned run average of 3.90. On December 12, 2009, Jukich was selected by the St. Louis Cardinals in the Rule 5 Draft, though he was eventually returned to the Louisville Bats.  In the fall of 2010, while Jukich was pitching for Los Leones del Caracas in Venezuela, he was informed that the Reds had sold his contract to LG Twins of the Korea Professional Baseball league.

Jukich played three seasons with the Twins. Overall, he posted record of 25-22 with an ERA of 4.00.

See also
Rule 5 draft results

References

External links

Career statistics and player information from Korea Baseball Organization

1982 births
Living people
Águilas Cibaeñas players
American expatriate baseball players in the Dominican Republic
American expatriate baseball players in Canada
American expatriate baseball players in South Korea
Baseball players from Minnesota
Chattanooga Lookouts players
Dakota Wesleyan Tigers baseball players
Kane County Cougars players
KBO League pitchers
Leones del Caracas players
American expatriate baseball players in Venezuela
LG Twins players
Louisville Bats players
Sarasota Reds players
Sportspeople from Duluth, Minnesota
Stockton Ports players
Vancouver Canadians players